Knud Reimers (May 20, 1906 – 1987) was one of the most important Scandinavian yacht designers of the 20th century.

Biography
Knud Hjelmberg Reimers was born in Århus, Denmark and educated as a shipwright in Germany at Friedrich Krupp Germaniawerft in the twenties, a yard building large sailing and motoryachts at the time. His first employment was in Stockholm at the design studio of the famous naval architect Gustaf Estlander. When Estlander suddenly died at the age of 54 in 1930, the 25-year-old Reimers bought his design practice. He promptly sold six 22m² Skerry cruisers to the Detroit Yacht Club. He later drew plans for the great 75m² Skerry cruiser Bacchant (II) that furthered his reputation as a designer of fast cruisers and racers.

Reimers most celebrated construction is the Tumlare which was designed in the early 1930s (1933 from a majority of sources; No. 1, 'Aibe' was built the next year for Bengt Kinde), and became a popular class worldwide. Examples are to be found all round the Baltic, in the UK, North America and Australia. After owning the Tumlare Zara, Adlard Coles bought a 32' 'Large Tumlare' Cohoe, with which he won the RORC's Transatlantic Race from Newport, Rhode Island of 1950.

Reimers went on to design cruisers, offshore racers and a large number of exclusive sailing and motor yachts. Reimers boats are available in numerous countries worldwide and boats are still built to his designs. His drawing archives are at the Maritime Museum in Stockholm. Reimers also designed Motor yachts, e.g. Orwell Class, 25’,  (Yachting World 1938) and Swedish Express, 50’, (Yachting World 1938).

Reimers was also a lecturer, and produced films of races like the Tall Ships Race, Bermuda Race, Fastnet Race and Atlantic Race. Knud Reimers argued that in offshore race sailing, the final test is to create boats that can travel at sea in any weather, and said (loosely translated): "The boat is the means to reach the treasure beyond the horizon".

List of Knud Reimers yacht designs

Reimers designed numerous yachts for the metre Rule and square Metre or Skerry cruiser rule classes; they are known variously by length in metres or (more often) feet, and also often by their square metre rating etc. which together with the re-use of several names may justify this table as an attempt towards clarifying the confusing variety of naming conventions...

Further notes re designs
Sensa is given as a 5m class; 6m designs are mentioned; a number of individual boats to Reimers' designs are listed on the Australian square metre association website, e.g. Wings 44’, 1938/ Joyous- plans 1958/ Lady in Red: similarly, Jibslist mentions the 41' GOTA (original project name for the S30) and the 42'8" SCHARENKREUZER 40S.

Further notes re specific boats
Landfall / Flicka- in April, 1937, Reimers ordered the first 4 Albatross to be built by Oscar Schelin, Kungsors Batvarv, Sweden.  They were finished in March, 1938. #4 was named Landfall by the buyer and shipped to Texas. February, 2017, this remarkable boat is 79 years old, has had 10 owners and four names; she is (2017) being restored as Flicka in Port Hadlock, Washington.

References

Swedish yacht designers
Danish yacht designers
1906 births
1987 deaths
20th-century Swedish architects
Danish expatriates in Germany